The Deification is the fourth studio album by De Magia Veterum, released on October 22, 2012 by Transcendental Creations.

Critical reception 

Music journalist Ned Raggett of AllMusic says, "the roars of blastbeats and distorted vocals are there as ever, but it's much more of a shuddering wave than complete destruction, a slow, perfect crushing that finally pauses before roaring back even more skitterishly."

Track listing

Personnel
Adapted from The Deification liner notes.
 Maurice de Jong (as Mories) – vocals, instruments, recording, cover art

Release history

References

External links 
 
 The Divine Antithesis at Bandcamp

2012 albums
De Magia Veterum albums